The Party for Peace, Democracy, and Development is a political party in Mozambique. At the last legislative elections, 1 and 2 December 2004, the party won 2.0% of the popular vote and no seats. Its presidential candidate, Raul Domingos, won 2.7% of the popular vote.

The PPDD is an observer of Liberal International.

External links
https://web.archive.org/web/20120211105026/http://www.africaliberalnetwork.org/standard.aspx?i_PageID=1386

Political parties in Mozambique